Bagh (meaning "garden") may refer to:

Places

Bangladesh 
 Bagh Prachanda Khan, a village in Beanibazar, Sylhet district
 Lal Bagh, a neighbourhood in Dhaka
 Mali Bagh, a neighbourhood in Dhaka
 Rajar Bagh, a neighbourhood in Dhaka
 Sen Bagh, a subdistrict of Noakhali district
 Shah Bagh, a neighbourhood in Dhaka

India 
 Bagh Caves in Madhya Pradesh, India
 Bagh, Dhar, a town in Madhya Pradesh, India

Iran 
 Bagh, Ardabil, a village in Ardabil Province
 Bagh, Larestan, a village in Fars Province
 Bagh, Mamasani, a village in Fars Province
 Bagh, Gilan, a village in Gilan Province
 Bagh, alternate name of Bagh Chamak, a village in Kerman Province
 Bagh, Khuzestan, a village in Khuzestan Province
 Bagh, Lorestan, a village in Lorestan Province
 Bagh, North Khorasan, a village
 Bagh, South Khorasan, a village
 Bagh, West Azerbaijan, a village
 Bagh-e Olya (disambiguation)
 Bagh-e Sofla (disambiguation)
 Bagh, alternate name of Bagh-e Latifan, a village
 Bagh, alternate name of Bagh-e Sofla, Lorestan, a village
 Bagh, Zanjan, a village in Zanjan Country

Pakistan 
 Bagh, Azad Kashmir, a city in Azad Kashmir, Pakistan
 Bagh District, a district in Azad Kashmir, Pakistan
 Bagh Union Council, a union council in Abottabad District, Khyber-Pakhtunkhwa, Pakistan
 Bagh, Khyber Pakhtunkhwa, an area of Abottabad District, Khyber-Pakhtunkhwa, Pakistan
 Bagh-e-Jinnah (disambiguation)

Other uses 
 Bagh (garden) or Persian garden, a type of garden originating in Iran
 Peter von Bagh (1943–2014), Finnish film historian and director

See also
 Bagh Express, an Indian Railways express train
 Bagh-e Bala (disambiguation)
 Bagh Stallions, a cricket franchise
 
 
 Bagha (disambiguation)
 Kalateh-ye Bagh